Heo Jun (born July 1, 1977) is a South Korean television personality. He hosted TV show Invincible Baseball Team from 2009 to 2010. He is also host TV show Incidentally, Turn to the King since 2010.

References

1977 births
Living people
South Korean television presenters